William Joseph Thorne (4 March 195417 June 2020) was an English professional snooker player. He won one ranking title, the 1985 Classic. He also reached the final of the 1985 UK Championship, losing 16–14 to Steve Davis after leading 13–8. He was noted for his break-building, and was among the first players to compile 100 century breaks. He earned the nickname "Mr Maximum". After retiring as a player, Thorne became a snooker commentator, primarily for the BBC.

Career
Thorne was born on 4 March 1954 at the family home in Anstey, a village located near Leicester, to Bill Thorne, a Desford Colliery miner, and his wife Nancy. He had two brothers. Thorne was educated at the Thomas Rawlins School in Quorn, and played multiple sports but excelled the most in snooker. He began playing snooker while holidaying in Eastbourne at the age of 14. He left school at age 15 and became an estimator for a glass factory while practising snooker in Loughborough and then Leicester's snooker halls. Thorne became national Under-16 snooker champion in 1970, and won three concesutive National Under-19 Billiards Championship titles from 1971 to 1973.

He turned professional in 1975, but never really converted his early promise into success, only winning one ranking snooker tournament (The Classic in 1985). Thorne later said that he had "hardly looked" at the blue, considering it a "certainty". Thorne was runner-up in four other events that season: the British Open (losing 7–12 to Davis), the Scottish Masters (losing 7–9 to Cliff Thorburn), the Irish Masters (losing 5–9 to Jimmy White) and the Pontins Professional (losing 6–9 to Terry Griffiths).

He reached the quarter-finals of the World Snooker Championship in 1982 and 1986. Thorne won the 1986 Hong Kong Masters by 8–3 over Dennis Taylor in the final with century breaks of 102 and 106, and then defeated Davis 10–9 to claim the 1986 Matchroom Professional Championship.

He peaked at No. 7 in the world rankings in the mid-1980s, while also battling a serious gambling problem. Thorne began gambling when he frequented a billiard hall in central Leicester from the age of 16. In one incident, Thorne bet £38,000 on a match involving John Parrott, betting that Parrott would lose as he had lost his personal cue and had to use one supplied by the venue. Much to Thorne's dismay, not least because he was actually commentating on the match, Parrott recovered from a slow start to win, only worsening Thorne's debts. In an interview with The Guardian newspaper in 2004, Thorne admitted to placing bets of up to £20,000 on horses.

Thorne's bald head made him instantly recognisable and he was often referred to as the "Homer Simpson of Snooker". He first began commentating for the BBC during the 1980s, and he continued to work on the BBC's networked snooker coverage until he was dropped from the corporation's broadcast team after the 2017–18 season. He also had stints commentating on snooker for Sky and ITV. Thorne continued to commentate for BBC Wales on their coverage of the Welsh Open in February each year.

Alongside other Matchroom professionals, Thorne featured in the popular song "Snooker Loopy", written and performed by Chas & Dave. In the verse which begins "but old Willie Thorne, his hair's all gorn", Thorne's cameo line was "Perhaps I ought to chalk it", in reference to his gleaming head distracting his opponents. Thorne also appeared in the "Romford Rap" video with the rest of the "Matchroom Mob".

Thorne was described as a skilled break-builder and possibly the "missing link" between old-school percentage play and the current aggressive  game. He took 19 seasons to record 100 competitive century breaks. He was only the third player to achieve this feat and achieved a maximum break at the 1987 UK Championship. Thorne claimed to have made almost 200 maximum breaks, and was known as "Mr Maximum". Thorne won the World Seniors Masters in 2000, beating Cliff Thorburn in the final.

After retiring from the game in 2001, Thorne did not play another match for sixteen years; however, he returned to action in 2017 in the World Seniors Championship, where he lost 1–3 in the first round to Aiden Owens. The World Seniors Tour was formed in the same year, but Thorne did not enter any events that season. He began his comeback in 2019 at the Seniors Irish Masters, where he faced Jimmy White in his first match in the quarter-finals, losing 0–3, and the World Seniors Championship, where he lost by the same scoreline in the first round to Darren Morgan. His next match, in the first round of the 2019 UK Seniors Championship, proved to be his last; drawn against Michael Judge, Thorne lost 2–3.

Thorne also held the all-time record in the "Pocket Money" round of the BBC show Big Break, with a score of £540, until it was broken by Tony Knowles' score of £580 in April 1996.

Personal life
Thorne was married to former Miss Great Britain winner Jill Saxby and lived in Broughton Astley. He was previously married to Fiona Walker, with whom he had twin sons and a daughter. From 1982, he ran the Willie Thorne Snooker Centre club in Leicester, converted from a former motor taxation office, where Mark Selby used to compete in junior tournaments. In 2004, Thorne and writer Derek Marsden co-authored his first autobiography, Double or Quits. His second autobiography, Taking a Punt on My Life, was published in 2011.

In 2007, Thorne competed in Series 5 of Strictly Come Dancing with professional dance partner Erin Boag. They were voted off in the third week. He was friends with footballer Gary Lineker, which was the subject of the VHS production, Best of Friends – The Official Story of Gary Lineker & Willie Thorne. In 1985, Lineker was best man at Thorne's wedding. Thorne was a lifelong fan of Leicester City.

Illness and death
In June 2015, Thorne was diagnosed with prostate cancer after a psychiatrist ordered routine blood tests and told doctors about the diagnosis and Thorne began treatment.

Thorne tweeted on 18 March 2020 that he had been diagnosed with leukaemia. On 16 June 2020, he was placed in an induced coma after suffering respiratory failure in hospital in Spain. The following day, his carer reported that Thorne had gone into septic shock, was not responding to treatment, and died after his life support was withdrawn, aged 66.

Performance and rankings timeline

Career finals

Ranking finals: 3 (1 title)

Non-ranking finals: 15 (6 titles)

Pro-am finals: 2 (1 title)

Team finals: 2

Amateur finals: 4 (2 titles)

References

Further reading

External links

1954 births
2020 deaths
Deaths from cancer in Spain
Deaths from leukemia
English pool players
English snooker players
English sports broadcasters
People from Broughton Astley
Sportspeople from Leicestershire
Sportspeople from Leicester
English expatriate sportspeople in Spain
Snooker writers and broadcasters